Microbacterium binotii is a Gram-positive, rod-shaped and non-spore-forming bacterium from the genus Microbacterium which has been isolated from human blood from Foch Hospital in Suresnes, France.

References

Further reading

External links
Type strain of Microbacterium binotii at BacDive -  the Bacterial Diversity Metadatabase	

Bacteria described in 2009
binotii